Chinnar Wildlife Sanctuary is located 18 km north of Marayoor on State Highway 17 in the Marayoor and Kanthalloor panchayats of Devikulam taluk in the Idukki district of Kerala state in South India. It is one of 18 wildlife sanctuaries among the protected areas of Kerala.

It has earned the name for being the only rehabilitation centre for the Indian star tortoise in India.

It is under the jurisdiction of and contiguous with Eravikulam National Park to the south. Indira Gandhi Wildlife Sanctuary is to the north and Kodaikanal Wildlife Sanctuary is to the east. It forms an integral part of the  block of protected forests straddling the Kerala-Tamil Nadu border in the Anaimalai Hills.  The Western Ghats, Anamalai Sub-Cluster, including all of Chinnar Wildlife Sanctuary, is under consideration by the UNESCO World Heritage Committee for selection as a World Heritage Site.

Geography 
CWS is located between latitude 10º15' - 10º21' N and longitude 77º5' - 77º16' E.
 
The Munnar – Udumalpet road SH 17 passes through the sanctuary for 16 km and divides it into nearly equal portions. Average annual rainfall is only 500 mm, spread over about 48 days, because it is in the rain shadow region of the southern Western Ghats.

Other major peaks in the sanctuary are Nandala Malai , Kottakombu malai, Vellaikal malai and Viriyoottu malai .
 
The Chinnar and Pambar rivers are the major perennial water resources in the sanctuary. The Chinnar originates near Kumarikal Malai, follows the interstate boundary along the northwest edge of the sanctuary for 18 km and becomes the Amaravati River in Tamil Nadu.

The Pambar River originates in the Anaimudi Hills and is joined by seasonal rivulets and a few perennial streams originating from sholas in the upper reaches. It traverses the Turner’s Valley in Eravikulam National Park and flows down into the sanctuary through the Taliar Valley between Kanthalloor and Marayoor villages and eastwards through the sanctuary. It joins the Chinnar River at Koottar. The Thoovanam water falls lie deep within the sanctuary on the Pambar River.  This cascade is a major tourist attraction. The Chinnar, Pambar, Kabani and Bhavani are the only rivers of the 44 in Kerala that flow eastwards.

Settlements and crops 
There are 11 tribal settlements inside the Chinnar WLS, each is well demarcated by temporary stone walls.  The main inhabitants are Muthuvas and Pulayars. Cultivation of maize, ragi and lemongrass is practiced in the settlements.  The Mudhuvas carry out small scale ganja cultivation for their religious purposes.

Fauna 

The sanctuary's fauna comprises:
28 mammal species, including Indian leopard and spotted deer, Indian elephant, gaur, Bengal tiger, sambar deer, common langur, bonnet macaque, gray langur, Nilgiri tahr, rusty-spotted cat and grizzled giant squirrel;
225 bird species including yellow-throated bulbul;
52 reptile species including 29 species of snakes, Indian star tortoise and the largest population of mugger crocodiles in Kerala;
14 fish species observed in the Chinnar and Pambar rivers include Garra mullya, river-carp baril, giant danio and the endangered hill stream game fish Deccan mahseer;
15 amphibian species;
156 species of butterflies.
In 2016, 101 species of spiders were reported.

Flora 
 
There are 963 species of flowering plants in the sanctuary.
Ecoregions of the sanctuary comprise mostly grassland and wet grasslands vegetation and some South Western Ghats montane rain forests and high shola at the higher western elevations. South Western Ghats moist deciduous forests at mid elevations give way to dry deciduous forests and thorny scrub forests in the lower dryer eastern edges of the valley. The major xerophyticspecies in the thorny scrub forests are Acacia arabica, Acacia leucofolia, Acacia concinna, Prosporis juliflora, and Opuntia stricta.
 
The Marayoor sandalwood forest is located here.

Regional cooperation 
Senior officials of the Ministry of Environment and Forests (India), Principal Chief Conservators of Forests of Kerala, Tamil Nadu, Andhra Pradesh and Karnataka, together with other senior forest officials of these states and the Union Territory of Pondicherry, met at Thiruvananthapuram on 3 and 4 November 2006 and resolved several mutual issues concerning conservation and protection of forests and wildlife of the region.

A regular conference of the forest ministers and forest officials of the southern states is held once a year, in rotation in each state.

Gallery

References

External links

 Chinnar wildlife sanctuary Hut
 Chinnar Wildlife Sanctuary

Wildlife sanctuaries in Kerala
Geography of Idukki district
Protected areas established in 1984
1984 establishments in Kerala
Tourist attractions in Idukki district
Protected areas of Kerala